Nanorana conaensis (Cona paa frog, Cona spiny frog) is a species of frog in the family Dicroglossidae. Its name refers to its type locality, Mama in Cona County in Tibet. Note that while large parts of Cona County are located within Arunachal Pradesh in the area that is controlled by India but claimed by China, Mama is on the Tibetan side of the border. It has recently been reported also from Bhutan. Its natural habitats are subtropical moist montane forest, high-altitude shrubland, and rivers.

References

conaensis
Amphibians of Bhutan
Amphibians of China
Fauna of Tibet
Taxonomy articles created by Polbot
Amphibians described in 1981